Yves Jeudy (born 5 May 1958) is a former boxer from Haiti, who competed in the lightweight (- 60 kg) division at the 1976 Summer Olympics. Jeudy lost his opening bout to Ace Rusevski of Yugoslavia in the quarter-finals after the referee stopped the contest in the second round. Previously, Jeudy received two byes and a walkover. Jeudy won a bronze medal at the 1974 Central American and Caribbean Games in the lightweight division.

References

1958 births
Living people
Lightweight boxers
Olympic boxers of Haiti
Boxers at the 1976 Summer Olympics
Haitian male boxers
Competitors at the 1974 Central American and Caribbean Games
Central American and Caribbean Games bronze medalists for Haiti
Central American and Caribbean Games medalists in boxing